Delphi Falls is a hamlet in the town of Pompey, Onondaga County, New York, United States. There is a current population of 992. It was a prosperous town in the early 19th century. Businesses included a cheese factory, an evaporated milk production facility and a tannery.
Union Major General Henry Warner Slocum (1827-1894), an 1852 graduate of the United States Military Academy, and Civil War corps commander, was born near Delphi Falls. Delphi Falls is located southeast of the hamlet. One actually has to cross over into Madison County. Delphi is rich in small water falls dotting the western side of the valley.

Near the town is a waterfall, also named Delphi Falls.

References

Hamlets in Onondaga County, New York
Hamlets in New York (state)